Brannock is a townland in Poyntzpass, County Armagh. It comes from the Irish name Bran Cnoc which translates as Hill of the Raven. It is situated in the Barony of Orior Lower and the Parish of Ballymore. A number of well-known local families and people were from, or lived in, Brannock such as MacCulla, Calvert, McComb, McGivern, Morrow, Alexander and Mackle.

See also
 Federnagh
 List of townlands in County Armagh
 Druminargal

References

Townlands of County Armagh